Caherdaniel is a village in County Kerry, Ireland, located on the Iveragh peninsula on the Ring of Kerry. It is on the southwestern side of the peninsula, facing onto Derrynane Bay, at a T-junction on the N70 road.

A stone ringfort (cathair in Irish) is nearby, as is Derrynane House, which was home to Daniel O'Connell. Copper ore was mined in the area, the first mines dating back to about 2000 BC.

See also
List of towns and villages in Ireland

References

Towns and villages in County Kerry
Forts in the Republic of Ireland
Iveragh Peninsula